Gabbi Alon Tuft (born November 1, 1978)  is an American retired professional wrestler. Tuft is best known for her time with WWE under the ring name Tyler Reks. Tuft also competed in WWE's developmental territory Florida Championship Wrestling (FCW), where she won the FCW Florida Heavyweight Championship once and the FCW Florida Tag Team Championship twice, once with Joe Hennig and once with Johnny Curtis. 

Since retiring from professional wrestling in 2014, Tuft works in marketing. She also launched a fitness website with several other wrestlers. Gabbi Tuft publicly came out as a trans woman in February 2021.

Early life 

Tuft was born on November 1, 1978, in San Francisco, California. Tuft attended the Santa Rosa Junior College in Santa Rosa, California, from 1996–1999 and then transferred to the California Polytechnic University in San Luis Obispo (Cal Poly–SLO) in 2000. There she completed her coursework and obtained a degree in civil engineering with a major in hydrology and structural engineering. After graduating, Tuft secured a job as an assistant engineer at PBS&J in Encinitas, California. She was staffed at the City of Dana Point as an extension of staff and was in charge of the Public Works Permitting Department.

Professional wrestling career

Independent circuit (2007–2008) 
Tuft was trained by Mike Bell. She made her professional debut in February 2007 for Ultimate Pro Wrestling.

World Wrestling Entertainment/WWE

Florida Championship Wrestling (2008–2009) 
Tuft was signed to a developmental contract with World Wrestling Entertainment in January 2008 and was assigned to the Florida Championship Wrestling territory as Tyler Reks. She made her FCW debut on February 5, 2008, with Johnny Curtis in a losing effort against Eric Pérez and Eddie Colon.
A few days later on February 12 she made her singles FCW debut in a losing effort once again against "The South City Thriller" Hade Vansen. She participated in a FCW Florida Heavyweight Title Battle Royal which was won by Jake Hager. She also took part in the FCW Florida Tag Team Title Tournament with Rycklon. During this tournament she had her first victory at FCW defeating Ted DiBiase Jr. and Afa, Jr. in the first round, however the pair subsequently lost to Eddie Colon and Eric Perez in the quarter finals. Tuft then had two chances at the FCW Florida Heavyweight Championship against the current champion Jake Hager; first in a one on one match and then in a triple threat match along with Johnny Curtis. On the August 28 she participated in an FCW Florida Heavyweight Championship No. 1 Contendership Fatal Four Way along with Johnny Curtis, Tyrone Evans, and Sheamus O'Shaunessy, who went on to win the match. Tuft then went on to have another two FCW Florida Heavyweight Championship shots against Sheamus O'Shaunessy and lost both times. On December 11, 2008, Reks and Johnny Curtis defeated The New Hart Foundation (DH Smith and TJ Wilson) to win the Florida Tag Team Championship in Tampa, Florida. After numerous defenses and 139 days of holding the titles, they lost them to Caylen Croft and Trent Barreta. Tuft won FCW Florida Heavyweight Title No. 1 Contendership match and on June 11, 2009, she captured the Florida Heavyweight Championship by defeating Drew McIntyre. She later lost the title to Heath Slater at the FCW television tapings on August 13. She later lost to Slater again during her rematch for the title. She lost to Joe Hennig in a FCW Florida Heavyweight Title No. 1 Contendership match and lost a FCW Florida Heavyweight Title No. 1 Contendership battle royal. She and Leo Kruger had a FCW Florida Tag Team Title match against Epico but lost.

Singles competition (2009–2011) 
Reks made her main roster debut on ECW on Sci Fi on the June 30, 2009 episode, with a surfer in-ring persona, in a backstage promo with Zack Ryder. Reks had suffered a knee injury just prior to her debut, but was able to work through it and made her in-ring debut on the July 2, 2009, episode of WWE Superstars, losing to Ryder. On the July 21 episode of ECW, Reks gained her first win after defeating Paul Burchill, and then beat him again the following week. Reks participated in a 10-man battle royal on the September 15 edition of ECW for an ECW Championship opportunity against Christian, but the match would go on to be won by Zack Ryder. Tuft would begin a brief hiatus from television starting in November 2009 and began mainly working dark matches and house shows for both SmackDown and Raw and FCW matches. Reks was one of the participants in the 26-man pre-show battle royal at WrestleMania XXVI.

In April 2010, Reks joined the SmackDown roster following ECW's closure. After months of only working dark matches, Reks made her SmackDown television debut as a heel on the October 15 edition of the program while sporting a beard, chest hair, and new attire in addition to never referencing to her time on ECW. After a promo, she challenged and defeated Kaval in a match for the latter's spot in the SmackDown Bragging Rights team. On the Raw before Bragging Rights, she participated in a SmackDown vs. RAW 30 Man Tag Team Battle Royal, in which Smackdown was victorious. At Bragging Rights, Reks was able to eliminate Santino Marella before being eliminated by Sheamus. However, Team SmackDown was successful in winning the Bragging Rights Cup for the second consecutive time, which would end up being Reks' most significant accomplishment in her WWE career. After this, Reks was placed on Alberto Del Rio's Survivor Series team at the event. On the SmackDown before Survivor Series 2010 she competed in a Ten Man Tag Team Battle Royal but her team lost. At Survivor Series 2010 she was eliminated by Kofi Kingston as Team Del Rio went on to lose the match to Team Mysterio. Reks was then moved into a feud with Chris Masters, defeating him once on SmackDown and twice on Superstars.

On January 30, 2011, Reks made her Royal Rumble debut at the namesake event as she entered the Royal Rumble match as the sixteenth entrant, but was eliminated from the match in only 34 seconds by CM Punk and the New Nexus. Reks was involved in another dark battle royal at Wrestlemania 27. Reks participated in a battle royal to determine the #1 contender for the World Heavyweight Championship. Her last in-ring television performance for five months would be beating JTG on Superstars.

Teaming with Curt Hawkins (2011–2012) 

On April 26, Reks was drafted to the Raw brand as part of the 2011 Supplemental Draft. After wrestling dark matches for a few months, Reks made her Raw debut in a backstage segment with Curt Hawkins, Wade Barrett, and Alberto Del Rio. On the September 8 edition of Superstars, Reks made her in-ring return as she teamed with Hawkins to defeat Titus O'Neil and Percy Watson. Hawkins and Reks then began appearing on the fifth season of NXT, by attacking the Usos from behind on the September 27th episode of NXT. Over the next two weeks on NXT, Hawkins and Reks faced the Usos in tag team matches, with Hawkins and Reks winning the first match and the Usos winning the second match. Reks made her singles return on October 16 losing to Yoshi Tatsu. Reks participated in a World Heavyweight Championship number 1 contender 41 man battle royal and the "All I Want For Christmas Battle Royal" and was eliminated in both. Hawkins and Reks would lose to The Usos once again on December 6. Reks and Hawkins would then lose a non-title match to the tag team champions Air Boom on the December 22 episode of Superstars. Hawkins and Reks engaged in a feud with the duo of Trent Barreta and Yoshi Tatsu beginning in December of 2011. Both teams would play pranks on each other, with Tatsu being locked in a closet and Reks' hands being superglued onto an Xbox controller. The feud ended when Hawkins and Reks defeated Barreta and Tatsu on the January 18, 2012 episode of NXT.

Hawkins and Reks would then settle into the role of NXT's troublemakers, tormenting NXT host Matt Striker on his lackluster career and how they should be main-eventing NXT, even once going to the extent of assaulting him after a match. They forced Striker to appoint William Regal as NXT's prime authority figure on the February 29 episode of NXT. Regal would employ harsh measures to keep Hawkins and Reks in line, including threatening suspensions for bad behaviour and condemning them to janitorial duty, this caused them much frustration. On the March 21 episode of NXT Redemption, Striker was knocked out with chloroform by Johnny Curtis and Maxine, and then Striker was kidnapped (kayfabe) by unknown persons, later revealed to be Hawkins and Reks, who intended to blackmail Maxine into using her charms to get Regal to leave them alone. Unfortunately for Hawkins and Reks, Striker was rescued by Derrick Bateman and Kaitlyn. On the April 18 episode of NXT, the freed Striker confronted Hawkins and Reks about the kidnapping, and Hawkins admitted the crime. As punishment, Regal put Hawkins and Reks in a match against each other with Striker as referee and the loser of the match would be fired. Even though Reks won to supposedly save her job at the expense of Hawkins', Regal decided to fire Reks as well, sending the two troublemakers away from NXT.

However, Regal could not keep the duo away from NXT for long, as they managed to convince villainous higher authority figure John Laurinaitis to rehire them as NXT's security team on the May 9 episode of NXT. Hawkins and Reks would then continue to play the role of Laurinaitis' lackeys, confiscating anti-Laurinaitis signs at Over the Limit and attacking John Cena on the May 21 episode of Raw. Hawkins and Reks' association with Laurinaitis ended after Laurinaitis lost his job at No Way Out. On the final episode of the fifth season of NXT on June 13, Hawkins and Reks defeated Percy Watson and Derrick Bateman.

Hawkins and Reks would then engage in a one-sided feud with Ryback in July 2012. After both Hawkins and Reks lost singles matches to Ryback on SmackDown, Ryback defeated both of them in a handicap match at Money in the Bank. At Raw 1000, Hawkins and Reks, along with Jinder Mahal, Drew McIntyre, Hunico, and Camacho, attempted to ambush Kane to make a statement, but a returning The Undertaker interrupted the attack and the Brothers of Destruction disposed of Hawkins and Reks. The duo would once again lose to Ryback on the August 6 episode of Raw.

After being told by SmackDown general manager Booker T to "step it up", Hawkins and Reks debuted a stripper gimmick on the August 17 episode of SmackDown while squashing a jobber tag team. A week later, Reks asked for her release as she intended to retire from wrestling to spend more time with her family; she and WWE parted ways on August 21, thus ending the team.

Return to independent circuit (2014)
Reuniting with Curt Hawkins, the pair tagged together as part of Pro Wrestling Syndicate picking up a win in September against Kevin Matthews and Lance Hoyt.

Professional wrestling style and persona

Throughout her wrestling career, Tuft used the Burning Hammer as her finishing move.

In other media 
Reks, together with Curt Hawkins, created an animated YouTube series called MidCard Mafia in 2011, which was quickly cancelled and pulled from the internet after complaints from WWE management.

Personal life 
Tuft has been married to her wife, Priscilla since July 2002. They have one daughter, Mia, who was born in November 2011.
In the summer of 2019, Tuft underwent open heart surgery.

On February 4, 2021, Tuft came out as a trans woman.

Championships and accomplishments 

 Florida Championship Wrestling
 FCW Florida Heavyweight Championship (1 time)
FCW Florida Tag Team Championship (2 time) – Johnny Curtis (1) and Joe Hennig (1)
 Pro Wrestling Illustrated
 Ranked No. 156 of the top 500 wrestlers in the PWI 500 in 2009
World Wrestling Entertainment
 Bragging Rights Trophy (2010) – with Team SmackDown (Big Show, Rey Mysterio, Jack Swagger, Alberto Del Rio, Edge and Kofi Kingston)
 Slammy Award for Most Menacing Haircut (2010)

References

External links 

 
 

1978 births
American female professional wrestlers
Living people
LGBT people from California
LGBT professional wrestlers
American LGBT sportspeople
People from Cotati, California
Professional wrestlers from California
Sportspeople from San Francisco
Transgender women
Transgender sportspeople
21st-century professional wrestlers
FCW Florida Heavyweight Champions
FCW Florida Tag Team Champions